Hariman Sanatorium was the first chiropractic hospital with both in-patient and out-patient care in the United States when it opened on July 6, 1928.  It was built by George E. Hariman, DC in Grand Forks, North Dakota.  He managed the hospital until his death in 1977.  His son continued the practice for four more years until he sold the building to the University of North Dakota which used it to house the offices of Department of Anthropology.  They sold it to a developer in 1999 who converted it into apartments.

References

External links
George Hariman, DC - Profession Builder

Commercial buildings completed in 1928
Commercial buildings on the National Register of Historic Places in North Dakota
1928 establishments in North Dakota
National Register of Historic Places in Grand Forks, North Dakota
Hospital buildings on the National Register of Historic Places in North Dakota
Chiropractic organizations
Modern Movement architecture in the United States